Brunswick Football Club was an Australian rules football club which played in the Victorian Football Association (VFA) from 1897 until 1991. Based in Brunswick, Victoria, for most of their time in the Association they were known as the Magpies, and wore black and white guernseys. In its final two seasons in the VFA, it was known as Brunswick-Broadmeadows.

History

Brunswick Football Club was formed in 1865 and joined the VFA in the 1897 season. 

The club was colloquially known in its early days as the Pottery Workers or the Brickfielders, and its fans were known for sounding clayhole bells at matches; after changing their colours from light blue and red colors to black and white, they became informally, and then later formally, known as the Magpies. They struggled to be competitive in the league early on, finishing last in 1898, 1899 and 1902.

They won the first of their three 1st division premierships in 1909 which started a successful era for the club under former Essendon player Jack McKenzie. Up until 1915 they played in six finals series and four grand finals.

After consistently making the finals following the end of the war they won another premiership in 1925. In 1926, the club dropped out of the Association near the end of the season in protest against suspensions meted out to captain-coach Wally Raleigh and team-mate Hassett, but was re-admitted prior to the 1927 season under an entirely new committee.

They struggled during the early 1930s, both financially and on the field, forcing them to sell their finest players to Victorian Football League (VFL) clubs, but they went on to be one of the strongest teams of the late 1930s, winning three consecutive minor premierships from 1936–1938 and reaching three consecutive Grand Finals from 1937–1939. Their third and last first division premiership came during this period, defeating Brighton Football Club in the 1938 Grand Final by 33 points in what was the first premiership of the throw-pass era.

For the remaining fifty years of its time in the Association, Brunswick was consistently a middle-of-the-pack team. After the Association was partitioned into two divisions, Brunswick spent similar periods of time in both divisions; it was a regular finalist while in Division 2, winning three Division 2 premierships (1975, 1980 and 1985) from seven grand finals; but it seldom played finals in Division 1 and did not feature in a top division Grand Final after 1939.

Brunswick was one of several inner suburban VFA clubs whose off-field viability deteriorated through the late 1970s and early 1980s, in large part due to demographic shifts in the local area towards a higher migrant population which was largely uninterested in Australian rules football, and at different times the club was heavily in debt and appeared likely to fold. In October 1989, Brunswick entered into a merger with the Broadmeadows Football Club – which was a football club in an administrative capacity only, as it had a board of directors and enough local Broadmeadows support to have previously launched a bid to join the VFA, but it had no home ground nor a team active in any league – to form the Brunswick–Broadmeadows Football Club, which was still based in Brunswick. However, factional infighting between Brunswick and Broadmeadows members of the club's unwieldy 14-man board of directors distracted from any efforts to clear the club's debt (prompting the VFA to intervene and sack the board in August 1990), and the on-field position deteriorated dramatically after there was an exodus of 35 players in the 1990/91 offseason due to owing player payments; on 6 May 1991, after three enormous losses to start the 1991 season, the club withdrew from the VFA, and folded soon after.

VFA Premierships
1st 18/Seniors
 1909, 1925, 1938, 1975 (Div 2), 1980 (Div 2), 1985 (Div 2)

2nd 18/Reserves
 1919 (Melbourne District FA), 1931 (VJFA), 1932, 1933, 1936, 1963(Div 1),1971(Div 2), 1972(Div 2), 1983(Div 2), 1984(Div 2), 1985(Div 2)

3rd 18/Under 19's
 1956

VFA Club Records

Club Champions/Best & Fairest
 1938 J Dowling
 1939 H Jones & R Quinn (equal)
 1940 C Crawford & J Dowling (equal)
 1947 R Shaw
 1949 I McIvor
 1964 B Wicks

Brunswick FC Captains

 1991	David Callender
 1990	David Callender
 1989	David Callender
 1988	Tony West 
 1987	Tony West 
 1986	David Whillas
 1985	Barry Nolan
 1984	Malcolm Toy
 1983	Barry Nolan
 1982	Barry Nolan
 1981	Barry Nolan
 1980	Barry Nolan
 1979	George Stone
 1978	Barry Nolan
 1977	John Williams 
 1976	John Warden
 1975	John Warden
 1974	Jack Wrout
 1973	Daryl O'Brien
 1972	Daryl O'Brien
 1971	Daryl O'Brien
 1970	Alan Cook
 1969	Graham Leydin
 1968	Keith Burns  
 1967	Keith Burns
 1966	Keith Burns
 1965	Keith Burns
 1964	Jim Whiley
 1963	Jim Whiley
 1962	Jack Edwards 
 1961	Ron Clegg
 1960	Jim Whiley

 1959	Bob McFarlane
 1958	Jack Edwards 
 1957	Leslie Pollard
 1956	Les Stanley
 1955	Maurice Rolfs
 1954	Maurice Rolfs
 1953	Frank Nielsen
 1952	Frank Nielsen
 1951	Ray Priestley
 1950	Ivor McIvor
 1949	Ivor McIvor
 1948	Ron Baggott
 1947	Ron Baggott
 1946	Ron Baggott
 1945	Elton Plummer
 1944	N/A - WW2
 1943	N/A - WW2
 1942	N/A - WW2
 1941	Col Crawford
 1940	Roy McKay 
 1939	Roy McKay 
 1938	Roy McKay 
 1937	Roy McKay 
 1936	Roy McKay 
 1935	Jim Jenkins 
 1934	Jim Jenkins 
 1933	Wally Raleigh
 1932	Hedley Blackmore/Wal Warden
 1931	Charlie Pannam
 1930	Hedley Blackmore
 1929	Charlie Pannam
 1928	Tom Hassett

 1927	Cyril Bright
 1926	Wally Raleigh
 1925	Wally Raleigh
 1924	Dick O'Connor
 1923	Barney Herbert
 1922	Charlie Fisher
 1921	Leo Sullivan
 1920	Leo Sullivan
 1919	Henry Chase
 1918	Henry Chase
 1917	N/A - WW1
 1916	N/A - WW1
 1915	Henry Chase
 1914	Henry Chase
 1913	Jack McKenzie
 1912	Leo Leeds
 1911	Jack McKenzie
 1910	Jack McKenzie
 1909	Jack McKenzie
 1908	Henry Chase
 1907	Henry Chase
 1906	W Temple
 1905	R Casey
 1904	W Stevenson
 1903	R Coburn
 1902	R Coburn
 1901	R Coburn
 1900	R Coburn
 1899	Tom O'Loughlin
 1898	Tom O'Loughlin
 1897	Tom O'Loughlin

Notable players
VFL football

 Frank Anderson - Carlton
 Ron Baggott - Melbourne
 Hedley Blackmore - Carlton
 Lou Bols - Fitzroy
 Newton Chandler - Carlton
 Neil Clarke - Essendon
 Tom Clarke – Essendon 
 Ron Clegg - South Melbourne
 Charles Clements – South Melbourne 
 Ron De Iulio - Carlton
 Colin Dell - Footscray
 Frank Dimattina - Richmond & North Melbourne
 John Dowling - Melbourne 
 Jack Edwards - North Melbourne
 Glenn Gingell - Footscray
 Keith Greig - North Melbourne
 Frank Gumbleton - North Melbourne
 Wayne Harmes played one season in 1989 after leaving Carlton
 Mark "Jacko" Jackson – Melbourne/St Kilda/Geelong/South Fremantle & entertainer
 Graeme Jenkin - Collingwood & Essendon
 Joe Kinnear – Melbourne 
 Wally Lovett - Collingwood & Richmond
 Leo Maynes - Essendon/Fitzroy
 Robbie McGhie - Footscray, Richmond & South Melbourne
 Ivor McIvor - Essendon 
 Jack McKenzie - Carlton
 Roy McKay – Footscray
 Stewart McLatchie – Carlton
 Alby Murdoch - Essendon
 Daryl O'Brien - North Melbourne
 Daryl Schimmelbusch - North Melbourne 
 Wayne Schimmelbusch - North Melbourne
 Noel Smith – Essendon 1939 Gardiner Medal winner
 John Williams - Essendon & Collingwood
 Rodney Wright - North Melbourne & Melbourne

Other notable players
 Barry Nolan – 1978 J. J. Liston Trophy winner
 Tony West – 1986 J. J. Liston Trophy winner
 John Curtin – Australian Prime Minister
 Ernest George – 1913 Stawell Gift winner
 Paul Young – 1985 Stawell Gift winner
 Bill Jacobs - 1960s Australian Cricket Team Manager and Football Radio Broadcaster  #3AW - 1957 to 1991 incl 25 Grand Finals#
 Alex Gillon – the longest serving VFA president #27 years from 1954 until 1981#

References

External links

 Fullpointsfooty

Brunswick Football Club
Australian rules football clubs in Melbourne
1865 establishments in Australia
Australian rules football clubs established in 1865
1991 disestablishments in Australia
Australian rules football clubs disestablished in 1991